Cédric Pioline was the defending champion but did not compete that year.

Thomas Johansson won in the final 6–4, 3–6, 6–2 against Martin Damm.

Seeds
A champion seed is indicated in bold text while text in italics indicates the round in which that seed was eliminated.

 n/a
  Martin Damm (final)
  David Prinosil (second round)
  Alex Rădulescu (first round)
  Thomas Johansson (champion)
  Karol Kučera (semifinals)
  Kenneth Carlsen (second round)
  Daniel Vacek (first round)

Draw

External links
 1997 Copenhagen Open draw

1997 Copenhagen Open - 1
1997 ATP Tour